The women's 800 metres event at the 2021 European Athletics Indoor Championships was held on 5 March 2021 at 13:00 (heats), on 6 March 2019 at 19:00 (semi-finals), and on 7 March at 18:13 (final) local time.

Medalists

Records

Results

Heats
Qualification: First 3 in each heat (Q) advance to the Semi-finals.

Semifinals
Qualification: First 2 in each heat (Q) advance to the Final.

Final

References

2021 European Athletics Indoor Championships
800 metres at the European Athletics Indoor Championships
European